The men's tournament of basketball at the 1992 Olympics at Barcelona, Spain began on July 26 and ended on August 8.

This was the first time that NBA players were eligible to play in Summer Olympics basketball, following a decision of FIBA in April 1989. Until 1992, only amateurs and players from professional leagues other than the NBA were allowed to play.

The United States men's team, which was nicknamed "The Dream Team", won the gold medal by beating Croatia in the final, with Lithuania winning the bronze medal.

Format
The twelve teams were split into two groups of six teams, and a single round-robin was held within each group. The top four teams from each group advanced to the knockout stage for the medals and the fourth place in the final rankings. The four losing teams from the first round of the knockout stage played another knockout stage to determine fifth through eighth place in the final rankings, and the four teams eliminated in the group stage played in another knockout stage to determine ninth through twelfth place in the final rankings.

Ties were broken via the following the criteria:
 Head to head results

Squads

Schedule

Qualification

Preliminary round
The top four places in each of the preliminary round groups advanced to the eight team, single-elimination knockout stage, where Group A teams would meet Group B teams.

Group A

Group B

Knockout stage

Quarterfinals

Classification round 9th−12th place
Semifinals

11th place match

9th place match

Classification round 5th−8th place
Semifinals

7th place match

5th place match

Semifinals

Bronze medal game

Gold medal game

Awards

Final standings
Rankings are determined by classification games:

References

 Official Olympic Report

Basketball at the 1992 Summer Olympics
Basketball at the Summer Olympics – Men's tournament
Basketball at the 1992 Summer Olympics – Men's tournament